Ether is an unincorporated community in the northeastern part of Montgomery County, North Carolina, United States.  The ZIP Code for Ether is 27247.

A post office called Ether has been in operation since 1888. The community was named for ether, a drug once prescribed by a local physician.

References

Unincorporated communities in Montgomery County, North Carolina
Ether